Nellore revenue division (or Nellore division) is an administrative division in the Nellore district of the Indian state of Andhra Pradesh. It is one of the four revenue divisions in the district with twelve mandals under its administration. The divisional headquarters are located at Nellore city.

Mandals 
The mandals in the division are:

See also 
List of revenue divisions in Andhra Pradesh
List of mandals in Andhra Pradesh

References 

Nellore
Revenue divisions in Nellore district